William Beckley (January 15, 1930 – March 11, 2015) was a British American actor, best known for his role as Gerard the butler in the television series Dynasty from 1981 to 1989, and the reunion miniseries Dynasty: The Reunion (1991).

Other TV credits include: Combat!, Batman, Mission: Impossible, Hogan's Heroes, Night Gallery, Marcus Welby, M.D., Voyage to the Bottom of the Sea, Planet of the Apes, Charlie's Angels, Kojak, Fantasy Island, Hawaii Five-O, General Hospital, Barnaby Jones (in 4 episodes) and The Rockford Files.

Filmography

References

External links

Actor to raise funds to benefit Indians from the Lewiston Morning Tribune

1930 births
2015 deaths
American male television actors
20th-century American male actors